Sasha Nicole Clements (born March 13, 1990) is a Canadian actress. She is known for her role as Kiki Kincaid on the Teletoon sitcom Majority Rules!. She was cast in the 2005 fantasy The Snow Queen (2005). and the 2010 television series What's Up Warthogs!. She also starred in the Disney Channel Original movie How to Build a Better Boy (2014), playing the role of Marnie.

Early life
Clements was born in Toronto, Ontario. Her mother is Anna Clements, and her father is actor Christopher Lee Clements, who was an actor on the Canadian musical drama series Catwalk. She has two younger brothers.  Her great-grandmother is Russian Canadian. She enrolled in York University.

Career
Clements's first role with Juliet Stevenson in the BBC TV movie The Snow Queen (2005). In 2009, she won her first starring role in the Canadian Teletoon series Majority Rules!, playing 15-year-old Kiki Kincaid. and she guest starred in one episode of What's Up Warthogs! in 2010. She has had guest roles on television series such as Rookie Blue and Really Me (2011). Clements had a recurring role as Sarah on Lost Girl (2012). She guest starred as Emma in the premiere two episode of YTV's Life with Boys (2012). She then guest starred as Nikki in one episodes of Mudpit (2013).

In mid-2013, Clements began work on the Disney Channel Original Movie, How to Build a Better Boy (2014), alongside China Anne McClain and Kelli Berglund. The film is directed by Paul Hoen and premiered on August 15, 2014. In January 2015, Clements had a recurring role on the YTV and TeenNick series Open Heart as Rayna Sherazi. She guest starred as Cat in the premiere two episode of Canadian television series Degrassi: The Next Generation (2015). She also appeared in the 2015 Canadian television film based on the popular Degrassi series, Degrassi Don't Look Back (2015).

In February 2017, had a supporting role in the drama film From Straight As to XXX (2017), alongside Haley Pullos. and she working one episode with the internet personality Manon Mathews, on New Form channel, who has a series on YouTube. In 2019, she was cast in a co-starring role in the Jordan Barker film Witches in the Woods (2019), the project also stars Hannah Kasulka, and with her husband Corbin Bleu.

In July 2021, she was cast in the Hallmark Channel original entitled Love, for Real (2021), alongside Chloe Bridges, Camille Kostek and Corbin Bleu, directed by Maclain Nelson. In December 2021, She was cast for a Lifetime Christmas movie, titled A Christmas Dance Reunion (2021), directed by Brian Herzlinger. In 2022, she was cast in the comedy film Camp Hideout (2022), with Christopher Lloyd, and directed by Sean Olson. She guest starred as Wendy in the premiere one episode of HBO Max's Minx (2022). She then guest starred as Katya Miranova in one episodes of NCIS: Los Angeles (2022).

Personal life

In 2011, Clements started dating High School Musical star Corbin Bleu. On October 15, 2014, Clements and Bleu announced their engagement. They later appeared on TLC reality series Say Yes to the Dress.  They currently reside in Los Angeles. They married on July 23, 2016.

Filmography

Film

Television

Web

See also
 List of notable Russian Canadians

Notes

References

External links 
 
 
 

1990 births
20th-century Canadian actresses
21st-century Canadian actresses
Canadian child actresses
Canadian film actresses
Canadian television actresses
Female models from Ontario
Canadian people of Russian descent
 
Living people
Actresses from Toronto
Canadian expatriates in the United States